This is a list of notable events in music that took place in the year 1961.

Specific locations
1961 in British music
1961 in Norwegian music

Specific genres
1961 in country music
1961 in jazz

Events
January 15 – Motown Records signs The Supremes.
January 20 – Francis Poulenc's Gloria receives its premiėre in Boston, USA.
February 9 – The Beatles at The Cavern Club: The Beatles, at this juncture John, Paul, George and Pete, perform under this name at The Cavern Club for the first time following their December return to Liverpool from Hamburg. Beginning with this lunchtime session, the group would go on to make almost 300 appearances here in total.
February 12 – The Miracles' "Shop Around" becomes Motown's first million-selling single.
February 13 – Frank Sinatra forms his own record label, Reprise Records, which will later release recordings by The Beach Boys, Ella Fitzgerald, The Kinks and Jimi Hendrix.
February 14 – The Platters file a lawsuit against Mercury Records for breach of contract after the record company refuses to accept recordings on which Tony Williams does not sing lead. The group's lawsuit contends that their contract does not require this.
March 18 – The 6th Eurovision Song Contest, held at Palais des Festivals et des Congrès in Cannes, is won by Luxembourg with the song "Nous les amoureux", sung by Jean-Claude Pascal.
March 21 – The Beatles at The Cavern Club: The Beatles play the first of nearly 300 regular performances at The Cavern Club in Liverpool.
March 25 – Elvis Presley performs a benefit show at the Block Arena in Pearl Harbor, Hawaii. The show raises $62,000 for the USS Arizona Memorial fund.
April 13
Intolleranza 1960 by Luigi Nono, his first opera, premières at La Fenice in Venice.
The 3rd Annual Grammy Awards are held in Los Angeles, hosted by actor Lloyd Bridges. Ray Charles wins the most awards with four. Bob Newhart's The Button-Down Mind of Bob Newhart wins Album of the Year, Percy Faith's version of the "theme from A Summer Place" wins Record of the Year and Ernest Gold's "Theme from Exodus" wins Song of the Year. Newhart also wins Best New Artist.
April 17 – Dalida and Charles Aznavour receive Radio Monte Carlo Oscar Awards for Best Song.
April 23 – Judy Garland's concert at Carnegie Hall in New York City.
April 29 – Italian tenor Luciano Pavarotti makes his operatic debut as Rodolfo in La Bohème at the Teatro Municipale (Reggio Emilia).
May 1 – The Pulitzer Prize for Music is awarded to Walter Piston for his Symphony No. 7.
June 14 – Patsy Cline is hospitalized as a result of a head-on car collision. While she is in hospital, the song "I Fall to Pieces" becomes a big Country/Pop crossover hit for her.
June 25 – The Bill Evans Trio completes a two-week stay at The Village Vanguard in New York. It is the last time this trio will play before virtuoso bassist Scott LaFaro's death 10 days later. The five sets they play on the 25th are recorded, resulting in two albums, Sunday at the Village Vanguard and Waltz for Debby.
June–July – Stu Sutcliffe leaves The Beatles to resume his art studies in Hamburg.
July 1 – French composer Olivier Messiaen marries pianist Yvonne Loriod privately in Paris.
July 17 – Billboard magazine first publishes an "Easy Listening" chart, listing songs that the magazine determines are not rock & roll records. The first #1 song on this chart is "The Boll Weevil Song" by Brook Benton. This chart will be renamed a number of times, becoming the Hot Adult Contemporary Tracks chart.
October – John Cage's book Silence: Lectures and Writings is published in the United States.
October 17 – Former schoolfriends Mick Jagger and Keith Richards, later of The Rolling Stones, meet each other again by chance on Dartford railway station in Kent, England, on the way to their respective colleges and discover their mutual taste for rock and roll.
November 9 – The Beatles at The Cavern Club: Future manager Brian Epstein first sees The Beatles.
December 8 – The Beach Boys release their debut 45rpm single: "Surfin'"/"Luau" on the small California label Candix Records.
December 9 – The Beatles play their first gig in the south of England, at Aldershot. Due to an advertising failure, only 18 people turn up. In the early hours of the following morning they play an impromptu set at a London club.
William Alwyn sets up home with fellow-composer Doreen Carwithen, his former pupil, at Blythburgh in England.
The Leeds International Pianoforte Competition is founded in the north of England by Marion, Countess of Harewood and Fanny Waterman.
Bob Seger's musical career begins.
Indian tabla player Keshav Sathe and sitar player Bhaskar Chandavarkar perform with Larry Adler.
The Country Music Association (CMA) creates the Country Music Hall of Fame and inducts, Jimmie Rodgers, Fred Rose and Hank Williams as the first three members.
The score of Haydn's Cello Concerto No. 1 is discovered by musicologist Oldřich Pulkert in the Prague National Museum.

Bands formed
See :Category:Musical groups established in 1961

Albums released
 All the Way – Brenda Lee
 All the Way – Frank Sinatra
 Bikini Twist – Bill Haley & His Comets
 Blue Hawaii (OST) – Elvis Presley
 The Blues and the Abstract Truth – Oliver Nelson
 The Bobby Darin Story – Bobby Darin
 Bo Diddley Is a Lover – Bo Diddley
 Bright and Shiny – Doris Day
 Clap Hands, Here Comes Charlie! – Ella Fitzgerald
 Come Swing with Me – Frank Sinatra
 Connie At The Copa – Connie Francis
 Dance 'Till Quarter To Three – Gary U.S. Bonds
 Runaround Sue – Dion
 An Electrifying Evening with the Dizzy Gillespie Quintet – Dizzy Gillespie
 Ella Fitzgerald Sings the Harold Arlen Songbook – Ella Fitzgerald
 Ella in Hollywood – Ella Fitzgerald
 Ella Returns to Berlin – Ella Fitzgerald (recorded, released 1991)
 Emotions – Brenda Lee
 Explorations – Bill Evans Trio
 Garde-moi la dernière danse – Dalida
 The Genius Sings the Blues – Ray Charles
 Goin' Places – The Kingston Trio (including "It Was a Very Good Year")
 The Greatest Horn in the World – Al Hirt
 He's the King and His Band – Al Hirt
 I Have Dreamed – Doris Day
 I Remember Tommy – Frank Sinatra
 It's Morrissey, Man! – Dick Morrissey
 Jewels of the Sea – Les Baxter
 Joan Baez, Vol. 2 – Joan Baez
 Judy at Carnegie Hall – Judy Garland
 Listen to Cliff! – Cliff Richard
 Loin de moi – Dalida
 Lonely and Blue – Roy Orbison
 The Lure of the Grand Canyon – Johnny Cash
 Make Way – The Kingston Trio
 More Soul – Hank Crawford
 My Favorite Things – John Coltrane
 New Juke Box Hits – Chuck Berry
 Now Here's Johnny Cash – Johnny Cash
 Out of the Cool – The Gil Evans Orchestra
 Patsy Cline Showcase – Patsy Cline
 Rachmaninoff: Piano Concerto No. 3 – Byron Janis, Antal Dorati conducts the London Symphony Orchestra
 Rah! – Mark Murphy
 Ring-a-Ding-Ding! – Frank Sinatra
 Rick Is 21 – Ricky Nelson
 Roy Orbison at the Rock House – Roy Orbison
 A Scottish Soldier – Andy Stewart
 Send for Me – Julie London
 The Shadows – The Shadows
 Shirley Bassey – Shirley Bassey
 Sinatra Swings – Frank Sinatra
 Sinatra's Swingin' Session!!! – Frank Sinatra
 Sing to Me Mr. C – Perry Como
 Someday My Prince Will Come – Miles Davis
 Something for Everybody – Elvis Presley
 The Soul of Ike & Tina Turner – Ike & Tina Turner
 Straight Ahead – Oliver Nelson
 Stranger on the Shore – Acker Bilk
 Sunday at the Village Vanguard – Bill Evans Trio
 The Swingin's Mutual! – Nancy Wilson with the George Shearing quintet
 Time Further Out – Dave Brubeck
 21 Today – Cliff Richard
 Twist – Bill Haley & His Comets
 West Side Story – Cal Tjader
 West Side Story – Original Soundtrack
 Whatever Julie Wants – Julie London
 The Young Ones – Cliff Richard and The Shadows

Biggest hit singles
The following singles achieved the highest chart positions in 1961.

Top hits on record

Published popular music 
 "Another Time, Another Place" w.m. Richard Adler from the musical Kwamina
 "Baby Elephant Walk" m. Henry Mancini from the film Hatari!
 "Big, Bad John" w.m. Jimmy Dean
 "Blue Bayou" w.m. Joe Melson & Roy Orbison
 "Breaking In A Brand New Broken Heart" w.m. Howard Greenfield & Jack Keller
 "Crazy" w.m. Willie Nelson
 Cruella DeVil w.m. Mel Leven, from the Walt Disney animated film 101 Dalmatians
 "Crying" w.m. Joe Melson & Roy Orbison
 "Funny How Time Slips Away" w.m. Willie Nelson
 "Hats Off to Larry" w.m. Del Shannon
 "Hit the Road Jack" w.m. Percy Mayfield
 "I Love How You Love Me" w.m. Barry Mann & Larry Kolber
 "Let's Get Together" w.m. Richard M. Sherman & Robert B. Sherman from the film The Parent Trap
 "Let's Twist Again" w.m. Dave Appell & Kal Mann
 "Little Miss Stuck-up" w.m. Lee Pockriss & Paul Vance
 "Love Makes the World Go 'Round" w.m. Bob Merrill from the film Carnival!
 "Mister Ed theme song" w.m. Jay Livingston & Ray Evans
 "Moon River" w. Johnny Mercer m. Henry Mancini from the film Breakfast at Tiffany's
 "Multiplication" w.m. Bobby Darin. Introduced by Bobby Darin in the film Come September.
 "My Kind of Girl" w.m. Leslie Bricusse
 "The Passenger's Always Right" w.m. Noël Coward from the musical Sail Away
 "Pocketful Of Miracles" w. Sammy Cahn m. Jimmy Van Heusen from the film Pocketful of Miracles
 "Running Scared" w.m. Joe Melson & Roy Orbison
 "Speedy Gonzales" w.m David Hess, Buddy Kaye & Ethel Lee
 "Ten Girls Ago" w. Diane Lampert m. Sammy Fain
 "Tender Is the Night" w. Paul Francis Webster m. Sammy Fain. Theme from the film Tender Is the Night
 "Tower of Strength" w. Bob Hilliard m. Burt Bacharach
 "A Walk On The Wild Side" w. Mack David m. Elmer Bernstein
 "When the Girl in Your Arms Is the Girl in Your Heart" w.m. Roy Bennett & Sid Tepper from the soundtrack album The Young Ones
 "Why Do The Wrong People Travel?" w.m. Noël Coward from the musical Sail Away
 "The Young Ones" w. Roy Bennett m. Sid Tepper from soundtrack album The Young Ones

Other notable songs
"Buliao qing" m. Wong Fuk Ling w. Tao Tseon, sung by Koo Mei
"Cunto 'e lampare" – Mario Trevi
"Mare verde" – Mario Trevi
"Nous les amoureux" by Jean-Claude Pascal
"Santiano" by Hugues Aufray
"Settembre cu mme" – Mario Trevi

Classical music

Premieres

Compositions
Samuel Adler – Symphony No. 3
Malcolm Arnold – Symphony No. 5
Milton Babbitt – Vision and Prayer
Henk Badings
Symphony No. 10
Te Deum for men choir and orchestra
Toccata I & II, electronic music
Niels Viggo Bentzon – Concerto No. 2 for violin and orchestra
Harrison Birtwistle – The World Is Discovered: Six Instrumental Movements after Heinrich Isaac, for chamber ensemble
Havergal Brian – Symphony No. 19
Benjamin Britten – Cello Sonata
Earle Brown – Available Forms I
Elliott Carter –
Double Concerto (1959–61)
Holiday Overture (revision)
Carlos Chávez – Soli II, for wind quintet
Mario Davidovsky –
Electronic Study No. 1
Piano 1961 for orchestra
Edison Denisov – String Quartet No. 2
Petr Eben – Piano Concerto
Morton Feldman
Durations 3, for violin, tuba, and piano
Durations 4, for vibraphone, violin, and cello
Durations 5, for horn, vibraphone, harp, piano or celesta, violin, and cello
Two Pieces for Clarinet and String Quartet
The Straits of Magellan, flute, horn, trumpet, harp, electric guitar, piano, and double bass
Alun Hoddinott – Concerto for Piano, Winds and Percussion
Vagn Holmboe – String Quartet No. 6, Op. 78
Jānis Ivanovs – String Quartet No. 3
Wojciech Kilar – balet The Masque of the Red Death
Yuri Levitin – Concertino for Cello and Orchestra, opus 54
György Ligeti – Atmosphères for Orchestra
Witold Lutosławski – Jéux vénitiéns for Orchestra
William Mathias – Second Piano Concerto
Einojuhani Rautavaara – Symphony No. 3
Alan Rawsthorne – Concerto for Ten Instruments
Dmitri Shostakovich – Symphony No. 12 in D minor, Op. 112 "The Year 1917"
Karlheinz Stockhausen – Originale, musical theatre, Nr. 12⅔
Toru Takemitsu
Music of Trees, for orchestra
Ring, for flute, terz guitar and lute
Bad Boy, for 3 guitars
Piano Distance, for piano
Edgard Varèse – Nocturnal
Mieczysław Weinberg – Concerto for flute and orchestra in D minor, op. 75
Isang Yun – Third String Quartet (1959–61)

Opera
Vittorio Giannini – The Harvest
Luigi Nono – Intolleranza 1960, 13 April 1961, Venice, Teatro La Fenice
Robert Ward – The Crucible
Grace Williams – The Parlour
Hans Werner Henze – Elegy for Young Lovers, libretto by W. H. Auden and Chester Kallman.

Jazz

Musical theater
 Carnival! (Music and Lyrics: Bob Merrill Book: Michael Stewart). Broadway production opened at the Imperial Theatre on April 13 and ran for 719 performances
 Do Re Mi London production opened at the Prince of Wales Theatre on October 12 and ran for 169 performances
 Donnybrook! Broadway production opened at the 46th Street Theatre on May 18 and ran for 68 performances.
 The Fantasticks London production opened on September 7 and ran for 44 performances
 How to Succeed in Business Without Really Trying (Music and Lyrics: Frank Loesser Book: Abe Burrows, Jack Weinstein and Willie Gilbert) Broadway production opened at the 46th Street Theatre on October 14 and ran for 1417 performances.
 Kwamina Broadway production opened at the 54th Street Theatre on October 23 and ran for 32 performances
 Milk and Honey Broadway production opened at the Martin Beck Theatre on October 10 and ran for 543 performances
 The Music Man London production opened at the Adelphi Theatre on March 16. Starring Van Johnson, Patricia Lambert, Ruth Kettlewell and Dennis Waterman.
 Salad Days (Julian Slade) – London revival at Prince's Theatre
 Sail Away Broadway production opened at the Broadhurst Theatre on October 3 and ran for 167 performances
The Sentimental Bloke (Music: Albert Arlen Lyrics: Nancy Brown, Albert Arlen, Lloyd Thomson and C. J. Dennis Book: Lloyd Thomson and Nancy Brown). Premiered at the Albert Hall, Canberra, March. Melbourne production opened at the Comedy Theatre on November 4.
 The Sound Of Music (Music: Richard Rodgers Lyrics: Oscar Hammerstein II Book: Howard Lindsay and Russel Crouse) – London production opened at the Palace Theatre and ran for 2385 performances.
 Stop the World – I Want to Get Off (Music, Lyrics and Book: Anthony Newley and Leslie Bricusse) - London production opened at the Queen's Theatre on July 20 and ran for 485 performances.
 Subways Are For Sleeping (Music: Jule Styne Lyrics and Book: Adolph Green & Betty Comden) Broadway production opened at the St. James Theatre on December 27 and ran for 205 performances.
 Wildest Dreams (by Julian Slade) London production opened at the Vaudeville Theatre on August 3 and ran for 76 performances

Musical films
 101 Dalmatians Walt Disney animated film
 Amorina Argentine black-and-white musical film
 Babes in Toyland Walt Disney live action film starring Ray Bolger
 Blue Hawaii starring Elvis Presley, Joan Blackman, Angela Lansbury and Pamela Austin. Directed by Norman Taurog.
 Flower Drum Song starring Nancy Kwan and James Shigeta
 Gunga Jumna, Bollywood film starring Dilip Kumar and Vyjayanthimala
 Jagadeka Veeruni Katha, Telugu film starring N.T. Rama Rao
 Season in Salzburg Austrian musical comedy film
 West Side Story starring Natalie Wood, Rita Moreno, and Richard Beymer
 Une femme est une femme, directed by Jean-Luc Godard with music by Michel Legrand
 The Young Ones British musical starring Cliff Richard

Births
January 1 – Sergei Babayan, Armenian-American pianist and academic
January 13 – Suggs, singer (Madness)
January 14 – Mike Tramp (White Lion)
January 27
Gillian Gilbert (New Order)
Margo Timmins, Canadian singer-songwriter (Cowboy Junkies)
January 29 – Eddie Jackson (Queensrÿche)
January 31 – Lloyd Cole, singer and songwriter
February 8 – Vince Neil (Mötley Crüe)
February 13
Henry Rollins, punk/rock vocalist and spoken word performer
cEvin Key, musician (Skinny Puppy)
February 16 – Andy Taylor, guitarist (Duran Duran)
February 22 – Akira Takasaki, Japanese singer (Loudness)
February 27 – Hideaki Tokunaga, Japanese singer
March 2
Sara Mingardo, Italian operatic contralto
Simone Young, Australian conductor
March 15 – Fabio Biondi, Italian violinist and conductor
March 20 – Slim Jim Phantom (The Stray Cats)
March 27 – Tak Matsumoto, Japanese guitarist
April 1
Susan Boyle, Scottish singer
Mark White (ABC)
April 2 – Keren Woodward, singer (Bananarama)
April 6 – Gene Eugene, actor, lead singer of Adam Again
April 12 – Christophe Rousset, harpsichordist
April 28 – Roland Gift, singer (Fine Young Cannibals)
May 7 – Robert Spano, American conductor and pianist
May 9 – Sean Altman, American singer-songwriter and guitarist (Rockapella)
May 10
 Danny Carey, American rock drummer
 Ayako Fuji, Japanese enko singer
May 17 – Enya, Irish singer-songwriter
May 20 – Nick Heyward, singer-songwriter
May 29 – Melissa Etheridge, singer-songwriter
May 30 – Gina Sanders, opera singer and vocal pedagogue
June 1 – Peter Machajdík, Slovak composer
June 4 – El DeBarge, singer
June 6 – Tom Araya (Slayer)
June 9 – Debasis Chakroborty, Indian classical slide guitar player
June 10
Kim Deal, American singer, songwriter and musician, twin of Kelley
 Kelley Deal, American musician, twin of Kim
June 14 – Boy George, English singer, songwriter, DJ and fashion designer.
June 15 – Kai Eckhardt, German bass guitarist
June 18 – Alison Moyet, British singer
June 22 – Jimmy Somerville, British singer
June 24
Dennis Danell, American singer and guitarist (Social Distortion) (died 2000)
Curt Smith, singer (Tears for Fears)
June 25 – Ricky Gervais, English comedian and singer
June 26 – Terri Nunn (Berlin)
June 27 – Margo Timmons (Cowboy Junkies)
June 29 – Greg Hetson (Circle Jerks, Bad Religion)
July 2 – Paul Geary (Extreme)
July 5
Isabelle Poulenard, French soprano
Timothy Drury, American composer, keyboardist, guitarist, vocalist, songwriter and visual artist
July 6 – Rick Price, Australian singer/songwriter
July 7 – Leon Bosch, South African-born double bass player
July 8
Andrew Fletcher, English keyboard player (Depeche Mode) (died 2022)
Toby Keith, American singer-songwriter, guitarist, producer, and actor
July 10 – Jacky Cheung, Hong Kong singer and actor
July 17 – Guru, American rapper, producer and actor (Gang Starr) (died 2010)
July 22 – Keith Sweat, R&B/soul singer
July 23 – Martin Gore, English rock musician and songwriter
July 24 – Maxim Fedotov, violinist and conductor
July 26
Gary Cherone American rock singer (Extreme)
Keiko Matsui, Japanese pianist and composer
August 2 – Pete de Freitas, Trinidad-born rock drummer (Echo & the Bunnymen) (died 1989)
August 7 – Carlos Vives, Colombian vallenato vocalist and television actor
August 8
Rikki Rockett, born Richard Ream, American glam rock drummer (Poison)
The Edge, born David Howell Evans, British rock guitarist (U2)
August 10 – Jon Farriss, Australian rock drummer (INXS)
August 12 – Lawrence (Hayward), English alternative rock musician
August 15 – Matt Johnson, English singer-songwriter
August 19 – Cor Bakker, Dutch pianist
August 22
Andrés Calamaro, Argentine musician
Roland Orzabal, English new wave singer-songwriter (Tears for Fears)
August 23 – Dean DeLeo (Stone Temple Pilots)
August 24 – Mark Bedford (Madness)
August 25 – Billy Ray Cyrus, American singer and actor
August 26 – Daniel Lévi, French singer-songwriter, composer and pianist
August 28 – Kim Appleby, singer (Mel and Kim)
September 2 – Ron Wasserman, composer and singer
September 5 – Marc-André Hamelin, pianist and composer
September 6
Scott Travis, American metal drummer (Judas Priest)
Paul Waaktaar-Savoy, guitarist and songwriter (a-ha)
September 7 – Jean-Yves Thibaudet, pianist
September 12 – Mylène Farmer, singer, songwriter, actress and author
September 13 – Dave Mustaine (Megadeth)
September 16
Bilinda Butcher, English singer-songwriter and guitarist (My Bloody Valentine)
T La Rock, American rapper
September 22 – Michael Torke, composer
September 27 – Andy Lau, Hong Kong actor and singer
September 30 – Sally Yeh, Hong Kong singer and actress
October 8 – Ted Kooshian, American jazz pianist
October 9 – Kurt Neumann (The BoDeans)
October 10 – Martin Kemp (Spandau Ballet)
October 11 – Amr Diab, Egyptian singer
October 18 – Wynton Marsalis, jazz trumpeter and composer
October 26 – Erica Muhl, American composer and conductor
October 29 – Randy Jackson, singer (The Jacksons)
October 31 – Larry Mullen, drummer for the rock band U2
November 2 – k.d. lang, Canadian singer-songwriter
November 4
Daron Hagen, classical and opera composer
Edward Knight, American composer
November 5 – David Bryson (Counting Crows)
November 6 – Daniele Gatti, conductor
November 8 – Leif Garrett, singer
November 12 – Michaela Paetsch, American violinist
November 13 – Klayton, American rock musician
November 14
Antonio Flores, Spanish singer-songwriter and actor (died 1995)
Brett Walker, American songwriter and producer (died 2013)
November 18 – Anthony Warlow, Australian singer
November 20 – Jim Brickman, songwriter and pianist
November 22 – Stephen Hough, pianist
November 25 – Nuccia Focile, operatic soprano
December 11 – Dave King, Irish-American singer
December 12 – Daniel O'Donnell, Irish singer
December 17 – Sara Dallin, singer (Bananarama)
December 20 – Mohammad Fouad, Arab singer and actor
December 29 – Jim Reid, Scottish musician (The Jesus and Mary Chain)

Deaths
January – Margaret Balfour, mezzo-soprano
January 13 – Blanche Ring, US singer and actress
January 14 – Henry Geehl, pianist, 79
February 4 – Alphonse Picou, jazz musician
February 7 – Noah Lewis, jug band musician
February 20 – Percy Grainger, pianist and composer
March 3 – Paul Wittgenstein, pianist, 73
March 6 – George Formby, English Music hall comedian, singer & songwriter and ukulele player extraordinaire
March 8 – Sir Thomas Beecham, conductor
March 9 – Wilber Sweatman, jazz musician and composer
March 16 – Václav Talich, Czech conductor, violinist and teacher, 77
March 24 – Freddy Johnson, jazz pianist and singer, 57 (cancer)
April 2 – Wallingford Riegger, composer
April 19 – Manuel Quiroga, violinist, 69
April 29
Cisco Houston, folk singer
Miff Mole, jazz trombonist and bandleader
May 8 – Victor Cornelius, Danish composer, pianist and singer, 63
May 29 – Uuno Klami, composer
June 6 – Art Gillham, songwriter
July 6 – Scott LaFaro, jazz bassist
August 8 – Mei Lanfang, Beijing opera performer, 66
August 14 – Heddle Nash, operatic tenor
August 15
Stick McGhee, guitarist
Morton Harvey, vaudeville entertainer
August 24 – Clarice Vance, "the Southern singer"
September 21 – Maurice Delage, pianist and composer, 81
September 23 – Elmer Diktonius, composer and poet
September 26
Bulbul, singer
Ernest Kaʻai, ukulele virtuoso
September 27 – Peter Dawson, bass-baritone
October 5
Carolina White, opera singer, 75
Booker Little, jazz musician, 23
October 11 – Chico Marx, comedian and pianist, 74
October 12 – Marguerite Monnot, songwriter, 58
October 13 – Maya Deren, dancer and choreographer, 44
October 20 – Sylvia Rexach, singer and composer, 39
November 1 – Joan McCracken, dancer, 43
November 22 – Ninon Vallin, operatic soprano, 75
November 23 – York Bowen, pianist and composer, 77
November 25 – Adelina de Lara, pianist and composer, 90
November 26 – Alexander Goldenweiser, pianist and composer, 86
December 18 – Leo Reisman, violinist and bandleader, 64
December 20 – Moss Hart, musical theatre librettist, 57
December 30 – Boris Ord, organist and choirmaster, 64
date unknown
Nadezhda Obukhova, operatic mezzo-soprano

Awards

Grammy Awards
Grammy Awards of 1961

Eurovision Song Contest
Eurovision Song Contest 1961

References

 
20th century in music
Music by year